Cry, the Beloved Country is a 1951 British drama film directed by Zoltán Korda and starring Sidney Poitier, Charles Carson and Canada Lee, in his last film role. The film is based on the novel of the same name written by Alan Paton.

Plot
From the back country of South Africa, black minister Stephen Kumalo journeys to Johannesburg to help his sister, who has been reported to be ill, and to search for his son, who left home and has not kept in contact. He is also asked to visit the daughter of someone who has not heard from her for some time. With the help of fellow minister Reverend Msimangu, Kumalo discovers that his sister, a prostitute with a young son, left home to find her husband but failed to find him and has been incarcerated in prison. He discovers that his son has impregnated a young girl and is a thief and murderer. Both live in a poverty-stricken urban community. The ministers confront the harsh reality of apartheid and its inimical effects on the country.

Cast

Production

Cry, the Beloved Country was the first major film shot in South Africa, with interiors filmed in the UK at Shepperton Studios. As South Africa was under apartheid, stars Sidney Poitier and Canada Lee and producer/director Zoltan Korda informed the South African immigration authorities that Poitier and Lee were not actors but were Korda's indentured servants. After his work on the film, Lee planned to prepare a full report about life in South Africa. He was called to appear before the House Un-American Activities Committee to explain his actions but died of heart failure before he could testify.

Reception
The film holds an 89% rating on Rotten Tomatoes. Those praising the film included Bosley Crowther in The New York Times, who stated: "It is difficult to do proper justice to the fine qualities of this film or to the courage and skill of Mr. Korda in transmitting such a difficult and sobering theme."

Awards
Won
 2nd Berlin International Film Festival — Bronze Berlin Bear

Nominated
 1952 Cannes Film Festival — Palme d'Or

References

External links
 
 

1951 films
1951 drama films
Apartheid films
British black-and-white films
Films based on South African novels
Films set in South Africa
Films directed by Zoltán Korda
British drama films
Films shot in South Africa
1950s English-language films
1950s British films